Dawood Goth is a neighborhood in Karachi, Pakistan, that is within Malir District.

One of the major villages of Malir  is Asoo Village. It is a 300-year-old village in which a Hindu merchant named Asoo Mal once owned nearly 100 acres of land.

References

External links 
 Karachi Website 

Neighbourhoods of Karachi
Malir Town